Celtix du Haut-Richelieu is a Canadian semi-professional soccer club based in Saint-Jean-sur-Richelieu, Quebec that plays in the Première Ligue de soccer du Québec in the third tier of Canadian soccer, since 2020.

History
The club was originally formed in 1969, with the name being inspired by Scottish club Glasgow Celtic. Prior to joining the PLSQ, the club played in the Ligue de Soccer Elite Quebec, which is the top amateur division in Quebec. They were accepted into the PLSQ in 2016 for the 2017 season, but did not end up joining the league at that time because of administrative reasons.

In 2020, the club joined the Première Ligue de soccer du Québec, a Division III league, fielding a team in the men's division. However, the COVID-19 pandemic forced the start of their debut season to be delayed, although the season did eventually return August 1. The club had planned an exchange program with three amateur clubs in France in the Burgundy and Paris regions, who would each send a player to Celtix on loan for the season, however, this idea was postponed due to the pandemic. They played their first match on August 1 against defending champions A.S. Blainville, losing 2–0. They finished in 3rd place in their debut season, which was ended prior to its conclusion due to new regulations from the Government of Quebec as a result of the second wave of the pandemic.

They will be entering a women's team in the female division of the PLSQ for the 2021 season.

Seasons 
Men

Women

Notable former players
The following players have either played at the professional or international level, either before or after playing for the PLSQ team:

References

Soccer clubs in Quebec
Première ligue de soccer du Québec clubs
Association football clubs established in 1969
1969 establishments in Quebec
Saint-Jean-sur-Richelieu